The Bonomi BS.2 Balestruccio was an Italian sailplane designed to set records.  In 1932 it set a new national endurance record with a flight of over 25 minutes.

Design and development
The Balestruccio was a single seat glider with a high aspect ratio gull wing built in four parts.  The two inner panels, straight edged with constant chord and carrying dihedral, joined on top of the fuselage, their extremities braced from the lower fuselage with flat steel V-struts, encased in faired wood to reduce drag and assisted on each side by a pair of jury struts.  The upper end of each strut was attached on one of the two wing spars. The outer wing panels were straight tapered, with rounded tips. There were differential ailerons on the outer trailing edges and flaps inboard.

The fuselage of the Balestruccio was hexagonal, with deep, near vertical sides. Its comfortable cockpit was immediately in front of the wing leading edge and was originally provided with a wooden canopy with small side openings, similar to that used on the German DFS Fafnir, but this was later replaced with a more conventional open arrangement which provided better all-round visibility. A single, sprung skid and a tail bumper provided an undercarriage. The fuselage tapered aft to a mid mounted horizontal tail consisting almost entirely of the elevator; although this had straight leading edges, a combination of their slight sweep and the full, rounded trailing edges gave the planform an almost elliptical appearance. There were aerodynamic balances and a large cut-out for rudder movement. As first constructed, the vertical tail was rather similar, with a small fin and a full, deep, curved, balanced rudder which extended slightly below the keel. Like the old rudder, this was also balanced and deep, though extending only to the keel. The original horizontal tail was retained.

Operational history
The Balesruccio proved to be versatile and efficient and was flown by Vittorio Bonomi and Enrico Rolandi from Mottarone and Campo dei Fiori di Varese. On 18 December 1932 Rolandi flew it for 25.8 minutes, setting a new Italian national endurance record, covering  and winning the Castiglione Trophy. As late as 1937, it was demonstrating its performance in Asiago.

Specifications

References

1930s Italian sailplanes
Aircraft first flown in 1932